Alta is a pair of Meso-Cordilleran languages spoken in northern Luzon. As both are primary splits from Proto-South-Central Cordilleran, they are paraphyletic and do not form a subgroup with each other (Reid 2013).
Northern Alta language
Southern Alta language

References

Austronesian Basic Vocabulary Database, 2008.
Reid, Lawrence A. (2013) "Who Are the Philippine Negritos? Evidence from Language." Human Biology: Vol. 85: Iss. 1, Article 15.

Aeta languages
Languages of the Philippines